The 2022 Hong Kong Chief Executive election was held on 8 May 2022 for the 6th term of the Chief Executive (CE), the highest office of the Hong Kong Special Administrative Region (HKSAR). Incumbent Carrie Lam, who was elected in 2017, declined to seek a second term for family reasons and finished her term on 30 June 2022. Former Chief Secretary John Lee was the sole candidate approved by the central government of China in the election and the only candidate to be nominated. He received 1,416 electoral votes (99.44%) and assumed office on 1 July 2022.

Background

Universal suffrage advocacy 
The highest office of Hong Kong government, the Chief Executive, is selected by an Election Committee (EC) dominated by pro-Beijing politicians and tycoons. Since the terms of Article 45 of the Basic Law of Hong Kong requiring "selection of the Chief Executive by universal suffrage upon nomination by a broadly representative nominating committee in accordance with democratic procedures" have not been implemented, the progress to universal suffrage has been the dominant issue in Hong Kong politics since the transfer of sovereignty in 1997.

Change of political landscape 
Carrie Lam, then Chief Secretary, assumed office as Chief Executive in 2017. Her tenure was marred by controversies and unpopular policies, including the scandals of her cabinet ministers. In 2019, the government push for amending the extradition bill spurred massive anti-government protests calling for the withdrawal of the bill, which later evolved into blanket pro-democracy protests. The Government partially conceded and shelved the bill after violent clashes, which failed to help comforting protestors.

A year later, the Hong Kong National Security Law was passed by China's central government to quell protests, followed by arrests of leading pro-democracy activists (also resulting in the dissolution of most pro-democracy political parties and organisations) and changing the electoral system. The changes allowed only government-defined "patriots" to rule the city, and allocated 40 legislative seats to the Election Committee (which also elects the Chief Executive), dominated by pro-Beijing members following the 2021 Hong Kong Election Committee Subsector elections. The number of directly-elected seats was reduced from 35 to 20. A new vetting mechanism would also be created to vet every candidate running for the Chief Executive, the Legislative Council and the Election Committee based on the approval of the Hong Kong Committee for Safeguarding National Security according to the review by the National Security Department of the Hong Kong Police Force (HKPF) whose decision would be final and could not be appealed. Local organisations seen as pro-Beijing would also be able to nominate candidates to the Election Committee. Ex-officio seats were also increased while directly-elected seats were decreased. Before the changes, the pro-democracy camp had expected to win a majority in the legislative election. This was the first election after massive changes to the political landscape in Hong Kong.

Pre-nomination events 
This year's election was unusually quiet compared to the previous elections with no heavyweights declaring to enter the race before the nomination period started. The Chinese Government had reportedly asked Hong Kong authorities to put a hold on the election procedures in January 2022.

Amidst the fifth wave of the COVID-19 pandemic in Hong Kong and following order from Xi Jinping, General Secretary of the Chinese Communist Party, to prioritize control of the pandemic, the Hong Kong Government invoked the Emergency Regulations Ordinance on 18 February 2022 to postpone the Chief Executive election from 27 March 2022 to 8 May 2022, despite Chief Executive Carrie Lam saying there was no need for a postponement just a week prior. Rumors grew in late March that the election could be postponed for a year with the current government's tenure extended for a year by the Chinese Parliament.

Nomination 
The nomination period for the election began on 3 April and ran until 16 April. The deadline for submitting nominations was 14 April as the Easter general holidays were ahead. Candidates had to be nominated by not less than 188 members of the Election Committee, including at least 15 from each of the five sectors.

Lee as "leader-in-waiting" 
On 4 April, Carrie Lam, eligible for re-election, announced that she would not seek a second term in office and would leave public service entirely, citing a desire to spend more time with her family. Lam said she had told the Central People's Government of her decision not to run for re-election in early 2021. Local reports then hinted John Lee, the Chief Secretary at the time, could join the race and to become the sole candidate of the election, adopting the Macanese modal of election. Hong Kong Liaison Office, the representative of the Chinese central government in Hong Kong, reportedly told Election Committee members on 6 April that Lee would be the only candidate for the post with Beijing's "blessing".

On 6 April, John Lee resigned as the Chief Secretary, and announced his intention to run in the upcoming chief executive election. Two days later, the resignation was approved by the State Council of China. Lee formally announced he would stand in the election later that day and held a news conference the following day.

On 13 April, Lee was nominated as the only candidate of the election, and the candidacy was confirmed by vetting authorities on 18 April. With a total of 786 nominations, Lee has already won the support of half of the Election Committee.

Reactions 
Lee was expected to secure enough nominations, and win the election without uncertainty. The pro-Beijing camp generally supported Lee as the next Chief Executive, with a campaign office composed of 16 deputy directors from a variety of backgrounds and as political heavyweights, some of those rallied for Carrie Lam, the incumbent Chief Executive, CY Leung and Donald Tsang, the former Chief Executives. The four real estate developer giants also supported Lee.

The background of Lee, having served in the police for decades, raised concerns about his hardline attitude and inexperience. Lee was also criticised as being "surprisingly weak and unprepared" in a "carefully choreographed" press conference, without details on election manifesto. Lo Kin-hei, chairperson of Democratic Party, the pro-democracy largest party now out of parliament, said anointing Lee implies the Chinese Government chooses to proceed with hardline policies.

Senior government loyalists also sought to play down criticism that the leadership race did not field any rivals to Lee. Maria Tam, former Convenor of National People's Congress Hong Kong delegation, said "having one person run for (chief executive) does not mean we have fewer choices".

Procedures 
Only the 1,461 members of the Election Committee can select the new Chief Executive. Candidates need to be nominated by at least 188 members of the Election Committee. Candidates winning more than 750 votes, half of the Election Committee, will be appointed.

Candidates

Nominee

Failed to be nominated 
None of the following candidates were successfully nominated.
 Ahm Warm-sun
 Lai Hung-mui, security guard
 Checkley Sin Kwok-lam, pro-Beijing film producer, businessman, kung fu master, internet celebrity, withdrew on 14 April and supported John Lee
 Siu Tak-keung, software engineer
 Titus Wu Sai-chuen, property investor, former member of pro-Beijing party DAB
 Wong Man-hong

Declined to run
The following persons had either expressed their wish to run or were considered potential candidates but were not allowed by Beijing to run or did not enter race:
 Paul Chan, incumbent Financial Secretary, hinted not to run after John Lee resigned
 Margaret Chan, former director-general of the World Health Organization (WHO), nominated John Lee
 Norman Chan, former chief executive of the Hong Kong Monetary Authority, joined John Lee's campaign office
 Charles Ho, member of the National Committee of the Chinese People's Political Consultative Conference (CPPCC) and chairman of the Sing Tao News Corporation, nominated John Lee
 Leung Chun-ying, vice-chairman of the National Committee of the Chinese People's Political Consultative Conference (CPPCC) and former Chief Executive, nominated John Lee
The following persons explicitly declined to run:
 Charles Li, former chief executive of the Hong Kong Exchanges and Clearing
 Bernard Charnwut Chan, convenor of the non-official members of Executive Council
 Regina Ip, chairwoman of the New People's Party and member of the Executive and Legislative Councils
 Carrie Lam, incumbent Chief Executive
 Chris Tang, Secretary for Security
 Henry Tang, Standing Committee member of the CPPCC National Committee, former Chief Secretary for Administration and 2012 candidate
 Jasper Tsang, former President of the Legislative Council
 John Tsang, former Financial Secretary and 2017 candidate

Campaign 

Lee unveiled his election manifesto on 29 April, vowed to strengthen governance, boost land and housing supply, improve Hong Kong's competitiveness and build a caring society if elected. Lee also announced legislating the city's own security law under Article 23 of the Basic Law. The manifesto was only announced nine days before election, making it the latest and also the shortest amongst all past candidates in the Chief Executive election.

On 19 April, the YouTube channel of Lee, an SDN, was disabled in order for Google to comply with United States sanctions. Tam Yiu-chung, the campaign chief of Lee, said the move was illogical. Lee's Facebook account was not axed but was demonetized and prevented from using payments services. Ministry of Foreign Affairs of China slammed Google's move, of which owned YouTube, and labelled the United States as interfering with Hong Kong 's election.

The only election rally of Lee was on 6 May, and only joined by invitees and press. Some observers said his presentation lacked human touch. The slogan of the rally was also noticed by the public for the grammatical error, which includes the rarely used Chinese wording "我和我們" (lit. "I and We"）and erroneous English translation "We and Us". Lee's campaign office later claimed the slogan hoped to show unity, and criticised those "only insisting on their ideas" are "disrespectful".

Result

This is the first sole-candidate election since the Chief Executive Election Ordinance was amended in 2006 which requires a vote of support.

The election was held at the 1/F of Hong Kong Convention and Exhibition Centre (HKCEC) from 9 to 11:30 a.m. on 8 May 2022, and at Penny's Bay Quarantine Centre from 9 to 10:30 a.m, where 6 electors cast their votes. Vote counting on 3/F of HKCEC finished within 23 minutes, and the election result was announced at 12:28 p.m. John Lee, the sole candidate, was declared the winner after receiving 1,416 support votes, or a record of 99.4%. Eight votes were not supporting Lee, whilst four were blank votes and 33 did not cast their ballots.

Reactions 

Elites in the city and the Chinese Government congratulated the highly-anticipated victory for Lee, including the China Liaison Office in Hong Kong, Chief Executive Carrie Lam, Hong Kong General Chamber of Commerce, and various pro-Beijing parties.

The selection did not gather many attention because of its non-popular vote nature, and the rather lack of human touch by John Lee. However, the victory speech of Lee was much noticed by the public, as he mistakenly wished the mothers in Hong Kong a "Happy Christmas" on Mother's Day, and suspectedly said in Cantonese "love Hong Kong this country", which pro-Beijing politician later clarified as "love Hong Kong this home" and slammed the anti-government sentiments for spreading "misinformation".

League of Social Democrats (LSD), one of the only remaining pro-democracy groups, held a three-person protest before polls opened, chanting "power to the people, universal suffrage now". Vanessa Chan, chairwoman of LSD, criticised John Lee for shrinking civil liberties in his "new chapter". Stand with Hong Kong, an activist organization based in overseas, called the leadership race a "sham election", and urged "democratic countries across the world" to not recognise the race.

Taiwan's Mainland Affairs Council urged John Lee to "listen and respond to the public's view, and respect Hong Kong people's right to pursue democracy, and stop hurting Hong Kong's freedom and human rights." European Union (EU), in the statement, regret the violation of democratic principles and political pluralism after election overhaul, adding that the EU saw this selection process as yet another step in the dismantling of the "one country, two systems" principle. Group of Seven (G7) also released a statement, expressing grave concern over the selection as part of a continued assault on political pluralism and fundamental freedoms, and call on China to act in accordance with its legal obligations. China dismissed statements by EU and G7 as "interfering" in China's internal affairs.

See also
 Lee government

References

External links
 Electoral Affairs Commission Official Website

 
Hong Kong Chief Executive elections
2022 in Hong Kong
May 2022 events in Asia
Elections postponed due to the COVID-19 pandemic
Single-candidate elections